Thomas Koch may refer to:

Thomas Koch (ice hockey) (born 1983), Austrian ice hockey player
Thomas F. Koch (born 1942), American politician who currently serves in the Vermont House of Representatives 
Thomaz Koch (born 1945), Brazilian tennis player
Thomas P. Koch (born 1963), mayor of Quincy, Massachusetts